Punjabhai Bhimabhai Vansh (born 1964) is an Indian National Congress politician from Gujarat, India.  He is also a Member of Gujarat Legislative Assembly. He belongs to Talpada Koli community of Gujarat.

Constituency

He represents the Una Vidhan Sabha constituency of Gujarat.

References

Indian National Congress politicians from Gujarat
Koli people
Living people
1964 births
Gujarat MLAs 2012–2017
Gujarat MLAs 2017–2022